Agarakavan is a village in the Talin Municipality of the Aragatsotn Province of Armenia. It was populated by Armenian genocide survivors from Van in 1920.

References 

World Gazetteer: Armenia – World-Gazetteer.com
Report of the results of the 2001 Armenian Census

Populated places in Aragatsotn Province
Populated places established in 1920